Waha Capital (traded as ) is an Abu Dhabi-listed investment company that offers shareholders and third-party investors exposure to high-potential opportunities in diversified asset classes. The company manages assets across several sectors, including aircraft leasing, healthcare, financial services, energy, infrastructure, industrial real estate and capital markets. Through its Principal Investments unit, Waha Capital has established a strong investment track-record, deploying capital in sectors that display robust demand fundamentals and that have been prioritised by governments in the Middle East and North Africa region. The company has also built a strong capability in managing global and regional credit and equity portfolios, which have enhanced the diversification and liquidity of Waha Capital’s balance sheet.

Since its foundation in 1997, Waha Capital has invested in five strategic sectors; offshore oil and gas services, aircraft leasing, financial services, healthcare and Infrastructure. As of December 2019, the firm had total assets of AED 9.3 billion/ US$2.5 billion under management.

History

The firm was founded by an Emirati businessman Hussain J. Al Nowais as Oasis International Leasing Company in 1997. Initially, the company operated as a leasing company of high-value assets, including aircraft, ships and infrastructure. As of 2000, the firm's shares are listed on the Abu Dhabi Securities Exchange.

Investment strategies
As the central part of the firm's investment strategy, Waha Capital is focused primarily on the MENA region’s emerging economies that are undergoing transition and set to grow. It makes direct investments commercially across a number of sectors and regional infrastructure funds.

Primary Investments
 Dunia Finance
 Anglo Arabian Healthcare
 Channel VAS
 Stanford Marine Group
 Mena Infrastructure Fund
 National Petroleum Services
 ALMARKAZ

Structure and key personnel
Waha Capital is an Abu Dhabi-based investment group established in 1997 and is currently being led by its current Chairman Waleed Al Mokarrab Al Muhairi and its CEO Amr Al Menhali. Other notable figures include Ahmed Bin Ali Al Dhaheri and Carlos Obeid  The firm initially began as a leasing company, Oasis International Leasing Co. and rebranded itself in 2007 as Waha Capital to focus on the investment business.

Awards
 In 2015 Waha Capital has been awarded the “Cross border deal financing of the year” award by the M&A Advisor.
 In 2014 Waha Capital has secured the “Corporate Deal of the Year” award by the Banker Middle East magazine.

Major acquisitions and investments
 In 2019, Waha Capital divested its stake in AerCap Holdings with a net gain of Dh40 million. 
 In 2015, the firm launched its second infrastructure fund with a value of $500 million.
 In 2010, acquisition of a 20% stake in NYSE listed AerCap, the stake rose to 26.3% in 2014.
 In 2014, acquisition of 90% stake of National Petroleum Services in Saudi Arabia, UAE, Qatar, Algeria, Malaysia, Brunei, India and Turkmenistan.
 In 2013, Waha Capital acquired Anglo Arabian Healthcare group, based in Abu Dhabi, Sharjah, and Ajman.
 In 2008, the firm co-sponsored $300 million MENA Infrastructure Fund I with 17.9 percent limited partner investment in it.
 In 2008, acquisition of 70% of Stanford Marine Group in Dubai.
 In 2008, the firm invested in Dunia Finance along with other investors.

References

External links
 official website

Companies based in Abu Dhabi
Financial services companies established in 1997